Horace Greeley, also known as the Greeley Memorial, is an outdoor bronze sculpture of Horace Greeley by Alexander Doyle, located in Greeley Square Park in Manhattan, New York. The statue, cast in 1892 and dedicated on May 30, 1894, sits atop a Quincy granite pedestal. It contains the following inscription:

See also

 Statue of Horace Greeley (City Hall Park), also located in Manhattan
 Tributes to Horace Greeley

References

External links 
 New York Typographical Union No. 6: Study of a Modern Trade Union and Its Predecessors by George A. Stevens, Issue 6, (pg. 632), State Department of Labor (1913)

1894 establishments in New York (state)
1894 sculptures
Bronze sculptures in Manhattan
Horace Greeley
Monuments and memorials in Manhattan
Outdoor sculptures in Manhattan
Sculptures of men in New York City
Statues in New York City
Greeley